Peter Bašista  (born 6 April 1985) is a professional Slovak footballer who currently plays for MFK Slovan Sabinov.

Career
On 13 July 2001, Bašista became a youngest player at the time in the Corgoň Liga as sixteen years and 98 days old.

On 31 July 2019 it was announced, that Bašista had joined Polish III liga club LKS Wólczanka Wólka Pełkińska.

Career statistics

Last updated: 28 December 2009

References

External links
 1. FC Tatran Prešov profile
 Peter Bašista at 90minut

1985 births
Living people
Sportspeople from Prešov
Association football central defenders
Slovak footballers
Slovak expatriate footballers
1. FC Tatran Prešov players
FC Steel Trans Ličartovce players
MŠK Žilina players
FC VSS Košice players
AC Sparta Prague players
FK Iskra Borčice players
Polonia Bytom players
Stal Rzeszów players
Slovak Super Liga players
2. Liga (Slovakia) players
II liga players
Slovak expatriate sportspeople in Poland
Expatriate footballers in Poland